Henry George Reginald Mews (December 18, 1897 – January 6, 1982) was the eighth mayor of St. John's, Newfoundland and a political leader in the province.

He was born in St. John's, the son of Arthur Mews, a civil servant, and Mabel Woods, the daughter of Henry J. B. Woods, who served in the colonial cabinet and was postmaster general from 1902 to 1914. Mews was educated at the Methodist College in St. John's and served as a lieutenant with the Newfoundland Regiment during World War I. After his return, he worked with the Goodyear Tire and Rubber Company in Ontario. Mews contracted tuberculosis and was treated in New York state. He returned to St. John's in 1927.

An insurance company manager with The North American Life Assurance Company, Mews was first elected to St. John's City Council as an alderman in 1943 and was mayor from 1949 to 1965. He served as leader of the Progressive Conservative Party when the dominion joined Canadian Confederation in 1949 and led the party in the 1949 provincial election in May losing to Joey Smallwood's Liberals and failing to win a seat in the Newfoundland House of Assembly. He was elected mayor for the first time on November 8, 1949, and stepped down as provincial party leader soon after.

During Mews' tenure as mayor, the city undertook a slum clearance program in its downtown and built public housing in various parts of the city. He also oversaw the creation of a large suburban development in the northeast of St. John's. In 1957, council created the St. John's Transportation Commission, taking over the city's privately owned bus system. During his term as mayor, the city had accumulated a substantial fund which was used for the construction of a new city hall in 1969.

Mews was married twice: to Vera Olga Sparling in 1926 and to Mary Summer in 1958.

References

External links
Baker, Melvin, St. John's Municipal Chairmen and Mayors, 1888-1988, Newfoundland Quarterly, Vol. LXXX1V, No. 1, Summer 1988, pp. 5–11.

1897 births
1982 deaths
Newfoundland military personnel of World War I
St. John's, Newfoundland and Labrador city councillors
Mayors of St. John's, Newfoundland and Labrador
Newfoundland and Labrador political party leaders
Royal Newfoundland Regiment officers